Al Martino (born Jasper Cini; October 7, 1927 – October 13, 2009) was an American singer and actor. He had his greatest success as a singer between the early 1950s and mid-1970s, being described as "one of the great Italian American pop crooners", and also became known as an actor, particularly for his role as singer Johnny Fontane in The Godfather.

Early life
Jasper Cini was born in Philadelphia, Pennsylvania.  The name Jasper was an anglicisation of his father's name, Gasparino. His parents were immigrants from the region of Abruzzo,  in the town of Nereto, Italy, who ran a construction business. While growing up, he worked alongside his brothers, Pasquale and Francis as a bricklayer. He aspired to become a singer, emulating artists such as Al Jolson and Perry Como, and by the success of a family friend, Alfredo Cocozza, who had changed his name to Mario Lanza.

Career
After serving with the United States Navy in World War II, during which he took part in the Iwo Jima invasion, in which he was wounded, Cini began his singing career. Encouraged by Lanza, he adopted the stage name Al Martino, based on the name of his good friend Lorraine Cianfrani's (née Losavio) husband Alfred Martin Cianfrani, and began singing in local nightclubs. In 1948, he moved to New York City, and in 1951 his first release was issued by the Jubilee label, "Heaven Help Me (I'm in Love)", coupled with "Hurry Home to Me". The following year, he won first place on Arthur Godfrey's Talent Scouts television program with a performance of Como's hit "If".

As a result, he won a recording contract with the Philadelphia-based independent record label BBS, where he recorded "Here in My Heart". Lanza's label, RCA Victor, had asked Lanza to record the song, but Martino called Lanza and pleaded with him to let Martino's version have a clear chance. The song spent three weeks at No. 1 on the US pop charts in June 1952, earning Martino a gold disc, and later in the year, also reached the top of the UK charts. It was number one in the first UK Singles chart, published by the New Musical Express on November 14, 1952, putting him into the Guinness Book of World Records. "Here in My Heart" remained in the top position for nine weeks in the UK.

The record's success led to a deal with Capitol Records, and he released three more singles: "Take My Heart", "Rachel", and "When You're Mine" through 1953, all of which hit the U.S. top 40. However, his success also attracted the attention of the Mafia, which bought out Martino's management contract and ordered him to pay $75,000 as a safeguard for their investment. After making a down-payment to appease them, he moved to Britain. His popularity allowed him to continue to perform and record successfully in the UK, headlining at the London Palladium and having six further British chart hits in the period up to 1955, including "Now" and "Wanted". However, his work received no exposure back in the US. In 1958, thanks to the intervention of a family friend, Martino was allowed to return to the U.S. and resume his recording career, but he faced difficulties in re-establishing himself, especially with the arrival of rock and roll. In 1959, Martino signed with 20th Fox Records; his deal scored him two albums, and four singles released, none of which was a major hit. The success of his 1962 album The Exciting Voice of Al Martino secured him a new contract with Capitol, and was followed by a mostly Italian-language album, The Italian Voice of Al Martino, which featured his version of the then internationally popular song "Al Di Là". He also made several high-profile television appearances, helping to re-establish his visibility.

In 1963, he had his biggest U.S. chart success with "I Love You Because", a cover of Leon Payne's 1950 country music hit. Arranged by Belford Hendricks, Martino's version went to number three on the U.S. Billboard Hot 100 chart, and number one on the Easy Listening chart. The album of the same name went top 10 in the Billboard 200. Martino had four other U.S. top 10 hits in 1963 and 1964 — "Painted, Tainted Rose" (1963), "I Love You More and More Every Day", "Tears and Roses", and "Silver Bells" (all 1964). He also sang the title song for the 1964 film, Hush, Hush, Sweet Charlotte. One of his biggest hits was "Spanish Eyes", achieving several gold and platinum discs for sales. Recorded in 1965, the song reached number five on the UK Singles chart when reissued in 1973. The song, with a tune by Bert Kaempfert originally titled "Moon Over Naples", is among the 50 most-played songs worldwide.

Martino's run of chart success faded after the mid-1960s, although many of his records continued to reach the U.S. Hot 100. Another later hit was a disco version of "Volare", (also known as "Nel blu, Dipinto di Blu"). In 1976, it reached number one on the Italian and Flemish charts, and was in the top 10 in Spain, the Netherlands, and France, as well as in many other European countries. In 1993, Martino recorded a new studio album with German producer Dieter Bohlen (former member of pop duo Modern Talking, producer of international artists such as Chris Norman of Smokie, Bonnie Tyler, Dionne Warwick, Engelbert or Errol Brown of Hot Chocolate). The single "Spanish Ballerina" (written in Bohlen's europop sound) reached number 93 in the German single charts.

Acting 
Apart from singing, Martino played the role of Johnny Fontane in the 1972 film The Godfather, as well as singing the film's theme, "Speak Softly Love". Martino had been told about the character by a friend who had read the eponymous novel and felt Martino represented the character of Johnny Fontane. Martino contacted producer Albert S. Ruddy, who initially gave him the part. Martino was stripped of the part, however, after Francis Ford Coppola came on board as director and awarded the role to singer Vic Damone. Martino, in turn, went to Russell Bufalino, his godfather and a crime boss, who then orchestrated the publication of various news articles that claimed Coppola had been unaware of Ruddy having given Martino the part. Damone eventually dropped the role because he did not want to provoke the Bufalino crime family (in addition, Damone felt he was being paid too little for the role). Ultimately, the part of Johnny Fontane was given to Martino. He played the same role in The Godfather Part III and The Godfather Trilogy: 1901–1980 (the television miniseries that combines The Godfather and The Godfather Part II into one film).

Martino later returned to acting, playing aging crooner Sal Stevens in the short film Cutout, which appeared in film festivals around the world in 2006.

Family
Martino was married first to Jenny Furini; then to Gwendolyn Wenzel; and, finally, to Judi Stilwell Martino, to whom he was married at the time of his death. He had three children: Alfred Cini, Alana Cini, and Alison Martino. Alison Martino is a writer and television producer of such programs as Mysteries and Scandals and Headliners and Legends.

Death
Martino died from a heart attack on October 13, 2009, at his home in Springfield, Pennsylvania, six days after his 82nd birthday. He was buried at Holy Cross Cemetery in Culver City, California.

Awards and honors
2009 – inducted into the Hit Parade Hall of Fame.
 Guinness Book of Records for first No. 1 record in the U.K.

Filmography

Discography

Studio albums

1959: Al Martino (20th Century Fox)
1960: Swing Along With Al Martino (20th Century Fox)
1962: The Exciting Voice of Al Martino (U.S. No. 109) Capitol Records
1962: The Italian Voice of Al Martino (U.S. No. 57)
1963: When Your Love Has Gone (20th Century Fox)
1963: I Love You Because (U.S. No. 7)
1963: Painted, Tainted Rose (U.S. No. 9)
1963: Love Notes
1963: Sings Great Italian Love Songs
1964: A Merry Christmas (U.S. Christmas No. 8)
1964: I Love You More and More Every Day/Tears and Roses (U.S. No. 31)
1964: Living a Lie (U.S. No. 13)
1965: My Cherie (U.S. No. 19)
1965: Somebody Else is Taking My Place (U.S. No. 42)
1965: We Could (U.S. No. 41)
1966: Spanish Eyes (U.S. No. 8)
1966: Think I'll Go Somewhere and Cry Myself to Sleep (U.S. No. 116)
1966: This is Love (U.S. No. 57)
1967: Daddy's Little Girl (U.S. No. 23)
1967: This Love for You (U.S. No. 99)
1967: Mary in the Morning (U.S. No. 63)
1968: Love is Blue (U.S. No. 56)
1968: This is Al Martino (U.S. No. 129)
1968: Wake Up to Me Gentle 
1969: Jean (U.S. No. 196)
1969: Sausalito (U.S. No. 189)
1970: Can't Help Falling in Love (U.S. No. 184)
1970: My Heart Sings (U.S. No. 172)
1972: Love Theme from 'The Godfather''' (U.S. No. 138)
1972: Summer of '42 (U.S. No. 204)
1973: Country Style1974: I Won't Last a Day Without You 
1975: To the Door of the Sun (U.S. No. 129)
1976: In Concert: Recorded With the Edmonton Symphony Orchestra (live) RockyRock
1976: Sing My Love Songs 
1978: The Next Hundred Years 
1978: Al Martino Sings (20th Century Fox)
1978: Al Martino1982: All of Me (MovieTone)
1990: Quando,Quando, Quando (Dynamic)
1991: Al Martino: In Concert (Prestige)
1993: The Voice to Your Heart; produced by Dieter Bohlen in Germany (Dino Music)
2000: Style (Varèse Sarabande)
2006: Come Share the Wine (Sin-Drome)
2011: Thank YouCompilations

196?: Romantic World of Al Martino (Capitol)
1965: That Old Feeling (MovieTone)
1966: Don't Go to Strangers (Pickwick)
1968: Al Martino (Guest Star)
1968: The Best of Al Martino (U.S. No. 108)
1970: Here in My Heart/Yesterday 
1971: I Wish You Love/Losing You 
1971: Al Martino (3 LP Set)
1978: Time After Time (Springboard)
1990: Greatest Hits (Curb)
1992: Capitol Collectors Series1996: 20 Great Love songs (Disky)
1998: Touch of Class (Disky)
1999: The Legendary Al Martino (Metro)
1999: The Al Martino Collection: I Love You Because (Razor & Tie)
1999: I Love You Because/My Cherie2000: Hits of Al Martino2004: Essential Al Martino (Fuel 2000)
2005: Ultimate Al Martino2006: We Could/Think I'll Go Somewhere And Cry Myself to Sleep2006: Very Best of Al Martino2007: An Introduction to Al Martino (Varèse Sarabande)
2012: Makin' Whoopee (Sepia)
2013: Take My Heart (Jasmine)
2018: The Singles Collection: 1952-1962'' (Acrobat)

Singles

 A "Spanish Eyes" reached #5 in the UK on re-issue in 1973.
 B "I Started Loving You Again" also peaked at #69 on Hot Country Songs.

See also

List of people from Philadelphia
List of Italian American actors
List of Italian American entertainers
List of acts who appeared on American Bandstand
List of artists who reached number one on the U.S. Adult Contemporary chart
List of artists who reached number one on the UK Singles Chart
List of Capitol Records artists
List of crooners

References

External links
 - Dead link.

1927 births
2009 deaths
American male film actors
Musicians from Philadelphia
American people of Italian descent
Traditional pop music singers
American crooners
Cub Records artists
Swing musicians
Capitol Records artists
United States Marines
American jazz musicians
Jubilee Records artists
Singers from Pennsylvania
People of Abruzzese descent
20th-century American singers
People from Springfield Township, Delaware County, Pennsylvania
Burials at Holy Cross Cemetery, Culver City
Jazz musicians from Pennsylvania
20th-century American male actors
20th-century American male singers
American male jazz musicians